Rödental is a town in the district of Coburg, northern Bavaria, Germany, 7 km northeast of Coburg.

Rödental was the name given to a group of municipalities that  united 1971, including Mönchröden, Oeslau, Einberg, Oberwohlsbach and Unterwohlsbach.

The oldest part of Rödental is Mönchröden, founded in 1108.  Mönchröden (meaning monks along the river Röden) has a 900-year-old monastery that is in well preserved condition, and contains several Gothic structures.

Oeslau, the largest of the components of Rödental, is the home of the W. Goebel Porzellanfabrik porcelain factory.

See also
Schloss Rosenau, Coburg

References

1960s establishments in West Germany
Populated places established in the 1960s
Coburg (district)